Moscow Peak, also Moskva Peak or Pik Moskva ( and also ), is a 6,785 m peak in the Peter I Range, western Pamir.

It is located in the south-east of Jirgatol district in Tajikistan's Region of Republican Subordination, about 10 km west of Ismail Samani Peak, Tajikistan's highest mountain.

Moscow Peak is also the name of two much smaller mountains in the United States and Australia:
Moscow Peak in the State of Arizona (Yavapai County), U.S.A. (2,343 m, 34.403082N, 112.396001W)
Moscow Peak in Victoria, Australia (1,647 m, 6.84401S, 148.1437E )

References

Location of Moscow Peak on geonames.org
Big Soviet Encyclopedia online edition 
Moscow Peak in Encyclopædia Britannica Online, 2008.

External links
Photograph of Moscow peak on summitpost.org

Mountains of Tajikistan
Six-thousanders of the Pamir